Theodore Arrington III (born February 5, 1978), better known by his stage name Vast Aire, is an American rapper from New York City. He is one half of the New York hip hop duo Cannibal Ox, which consists of him and fellow rapper Vordul Mega. He is also a member of the rap group Atoms Family. He was born in Mount Vernon, New York, then lived in Jamaica, Queens before moving to Harlem, and became acquainted with the underground rap scene, performing in many clubs while still a teenager. He was once a part of the underground hip hop group The Weathermen.

Career
Vast Aire's fame increased significantly as part of Cannibal Ox with Vordul Mega. Their debut album, The Cold Vein, recorded with producer El-P, was released in 2001 to critical acclaim. Since then, Vast Aire has pursued solo interests. His first solo album Look Mom... No Hands was released in April 2004. This was followed by The Best Damn Rap Show, a collaborative effort with DJ Mighty Mi from The High & Mighty in 2005. These solo projects did not break Vast Aire from his obligations at Definitive Jux with Cannibal Ox. Vast has since gone on to work with members from the Megahertz crew, and was a member of The Weathermen alongside Copywrite, Yak Ballz, Cage, Aesop Rock, the late Camu Tao, and Tame One.

Name 
When asked about the meaning of his name, Vast Aire explained: "I guess it means mad styles. I think it means a lot of attitude. Vast Aire. I have a very wordy type of style. Vast was given to me by a friend of mine I went to school with and the Aire pretty much came from me being a junior. My name is Theodore Arrington II. I used to spell it proper. H-E-I-R. But, in the past couple of years, I switched it to A-I-R-E."

Discography

Studio albums
Look Mom... No Hands (2004)
The Best Damn Rap Show (2005) 
Empire State (2007) 
Dueces Wild (2008)
OX 2010: A Street Odyssey (2011)

Compilation albums
Best of the Best Vol. 1 (2013)

EPs
A Space Iliad (2013)
The Heir Vast (2016)

Singles
"Look Mom...No Hands" b/w "Why'sdaskyblue?" (2003)
"Elixir" b/w "Candid Cam" (2004)
"Pegasus" b/w "Red Pill" (2004)
"In the Zone" (2016)
"Frankfurter" (2018)

Guest appearances
Aesop Rock - "Attention Span" from Float (2000)
Techno Animal - "We Can Build You" from The Brotherhood of the Bomb (2001)
Aesop Rock - "Nickel Plated Pockets" from Daylight (2002)
El-P - "Dr. Hell No and the Praying Mantis" from Fantastic Damage (2002)
RJD2 - "Final Frontier" [Remix] from The Horror (2003)
Diverse - "Big Game" from One A.M. (2003)
C-Rayz Walz - "The Lineup" from Ravipops (The Substance) (2003)
Push Button Objects - "Fly" from Ghetto Blaster (2003)
Jean Grae - "Swing Blades" from The Bootleg of the Bootleg EP (2003)
S.A. Smash - "Slide on 'Em (Escapade)" from Smashy Trashy (2003)
Aesop Rock - "N.Y. Electric" from Bazooka Tooth (2003)
Illogic - "Time Capsule" from Celestial Clockwork (2004)
Blueprint - "Small World, Big Plans" from Chamber Music (2004)
Vordul Mega - "Handle That" from The Revolution of Yung Havoks (2004)
Billy Woods - "Drinks" from The Chalice (2004)
Mr. Complex - "Calm Down" from Twisted Mister (2004)
Wu-Tang Clan - "Slow Blues" from Wu-Tang Meets the Indie Culture (2005)
Dabrye - "That's Whats Up" from Two/Three (2006)
Oh No - "No Aire" from Exodus into Unheard Rhythms (2006)
Wisemen - "Iconoclasts" from Wisemen Approaching (2006)
Toteking - "Jugar Duro" from Un Tipo Cualquiera (2007)
Vordul Mega - "AK-47" and "In the Mirror" from Megagraphitti (2008)
Double A.B. - "The Diesel" from The Diesel (2008)
Mind over Matter - "Clipped Wings" from Keepin' It Breezy (2008)
Sadistik - "Writes of Passage" from The Balancing Act (2008)
DJ Bootsie - "Vast Hope" from Holidays in the Shade (2008)
Atari Blitzkrieg - "The Cry from Within" from 12.31.99 (2009)
Notes To Self - “Lifeline” [Remix] from Warning Shots EP (2009)
Stress 1 - "Bring It Back" from Eyerockmics Vol. 1 (2010)
Virtuoso - "Bay of Pigs" from The Final Conflict (2011)
Lewis Parker - "Murder One" from Dangerous Adventures (2011)
Chasm - "Intergalactic" from This Is How We Never Die (2012)
True Believers - "Five Point Star" (2014)
Auxiliary Phoenix - "Night Light" from  Power Cosmic (2017)
Al Babblez - "On Point" from "Aire Raid" (2018)

Compilation appearances
"Adversity Strikes (One+One)" and "Not for Promotional Use" from The Persecution of Hip Hop (1998)
"Resolution" and "Mommi's Relay Race" from Old Trolls New Bridge (1999)
"Cholesterol" from Inside Out Vol. 1: A Fool Blown Compilation (2000)
"Pen Relays" from B-Sides Volume One: Blatant Battle Raps (2001)
"Tippin Domino's", "Tap Dancin for Scratch", and "Tippin Domino's (RJD2 Remix)" from The Bedford Files (2002)
"The Beam Up" from Eastern Conference All Stars IV (2004)
"Super Friends (Edan Remix)" from Chocolate Swim (2006)
"Blood of Bantu" from "Midlife Crisis" Obi Khan (2018)

References

External links

1978 births
African-American male rappers
Five percenters
Living people
People from Jamaica, Queens
Rappers from New York City
Underground rappers
Washington Irving High School (New York City) alumni
21st-century American rappers
21st-century American male musicians
People from Harlem
The Weathermen (hip hop group) members
Cannibal Ox members
21st-century African-American musicians
20th-century African-American people